Increasing methane emissions are a major contributor to the rising concentration of greenhouse gases in Earth's atmosphere, and are responsible for up to one-third of near-term global heating. During 2019, about 60% (360 million tons) of methane released globally was from human activities, while natural sources contributed about 40% (230 million tons).  Reducing methane emissions by capturing and utilizing the gas can produce simultaneous environmental and economic benefits.

Since the Industrial Revolution, methane concentrations in the atmosphere have more than doubled, and about 20 percent of the warming the planet has experienced can be attributed to the gas. About one-third (33%) of anthropogenic emissions are from gas release during the extraction and delivery of fossil fuels;  mostly due to gas venting and gas leaks from both active fossil fuel infrastructure and orphan wells.  Russia is the world's top methane emitter from oil and gas.  Animal agriculture is a similarly large source (30%);  primarily because of enteric fermentation by ruminant livestock such as cattle and sheep. According to the Global Methane Assessment published in 2021, methane emissions from livestock (including cattle) are the largest sources of agricultural emissions worldwide A single cow can make up to 99 kg of methane gas per year. Similarly to  released from fossil fuel combustion, fossil fuel methane essentially presents a different climate-warming profile to methane produced by biogenic sources (e.g. from animals). Biogenic methane is ultimately sourced from  already present in the atmosphere, and returns to this through oxidation (although contributes more to climate warming while in the form of methane). By contrast, fossil fuel methane (and ) is a source of new carbon to the atmosphere and, thus, additional climate warming. Human consumer waste flows, especially those passing through landfills and wastewater treatment, have grown to become a third major category (18%). Plant agriculture, including both food and biomass production, constitutes a fourth group (15%), with rice production being the largest single contributor.

The world's wetlands contribute about three-quarters (75%) of the enduring natural sources of methane. Seepages from near-surface hydrocarbon and clathrate hydrate deposits, volcanic releases, wildfires, and termite emissions account for much of the remainder.   Contributions from the surviving wild populations of ruminant mammals are vastly overwhelmed by those of cattle, humans, and other livestock animals.

Atmospheric concentration and warming influence

The atmospheric methane (CH4) concentration is increasing and exceeded 1860 parts per billion in 2019, equal to two-and-a-half times the pre-industrial level. The methane itself causes direct radiative forcing that is second only to that of carbon dioxide (CO2).  Due to interactions with oxygen compounds stimulated by sunlight, CH4 can also increase the atmospheric presence of shorter-lived ozone and water vapour, themselves potent warming gases: atmospheric researchers call this amplification of methane's near-term warming influence indirect radiative forcing. When such interactions occur, longer-lived and less-potent CO2 is also produced.  Including both the direct and indirect forcings, the increase in atmospheric methane is responsible for about one-third of near-term global heating.

Though methane causes far more heat to be trapped than the same mass of carbon dioxide, less than half of the emitted CH4 remains in the atmosphere after a decade.  On average, carbon dioxide warms for much longer, assuming no change in rates of carbon sequestration. The global warming potential (GWP) is a way of comparing the warming due to other gases to that from carbon dioxide, over a given time period. Methane's GWP20 of 85 means that a ton of CH4 emitted into the atmosphere creates approximately 85 times the atmospheric warming as a ton of CO2 over a period of 20 years. On a 100-year timescale, methane's GWP100 is in the range of 28–34.

Methane emissions are important as reducing them can buy time to tackle carbon emissions.

List of emission sources

Biogenic methane is actively produced by microorganisms in a process called methanogenesis.  Under certain conditions, the process mix responsible for a sample of methane may be deduced from the ratio of the isotopes of carbon, and through analysis methods similar to carbon dating.

Anthropogenic

A comprehensive systems method from describing the sources of methane due to human society is known as anthropogenic metabolism.  , emission volumes from some sources remain more uncertain than others; due in part to localized emission spikes not captured by the limited global measurement capability.  The time required for a methane emission to become well-mixed throughout earth's troposphere is about 1–2 years.

Satellite data indicate over 80% of the growth of methane emissions during 2010–2019 are tropical terrestrial emissions.

There is accumulating research and data showing that oil and gas industry methane emissions – or from fossil fuel extraction, distribution and use – are much larger than thought.

Natural

Natural sources have always been a part of the methane cycle.  Wetland emissions have been declining due to draining for agricultural and building areas.

Global monitoring
Uncertainties in methane emissions, including so-called "super-emitter" fossil extractions and unexplained atmospheric fluctuations, highlight the need for improved monitoring at both regional and global scale. Satellites have recently begun to come online with capability to measure methane and other more powerful greenhouse gases with improving resolution.

The Tropomi instrument on Sentinel-5 launched in 2017 by the European Space Agency can measure methane, sulphur dioxide, nitrogen dioxide, carbon monoxide, aerosol, and ozone concentrations in earth's troposphere at resolutions of several kilometers. In 2022, a study using data from the instrument monitoring large methane emissions worldwide was published; 1,200 large methane plumes were detected over oil and gas extraction sites. NASA's  instrument also identified super-emitters.

Japan's GOSAT-2 platform launched in 2018 provides similar capability.

The Claire satellite launched in 2016 by the Canadian firm GHGSat uses data from Tropomi to home in on sources of methane emissions as small as 15 m2.

Other satellites are planned that will increase the precision and frequency of methane measurements, as well as provide a greater ability to attribute emissions to terrestrial sources. These include MethaneSAT, expected to be launched in 2022, and CarbonMapper.

Global maps combining satellite data to help identify and monitor major methane emission sources are being built.

The International Methane Emissions Observatory was created by the UN.

National reduction policies

China implemented regulations requiring coal plants to either capture methane emissions or convert methane into  in 2010.  According to a Nature Communications paper published in January 2019, methane emissions instead increased 50 percent between 2000 and 2015.

In March 2020, Exxon called for stricter methane regulations, which would include detection and repair of leaks, minimization of venting and releases of unburned methane, and reporting requirements for companies.  However, in August 2020, the U.S. Environmental Protection Agency rescinded a prior tightening of methane emission rules for the U.S. oil and gas industry.

Removal technology
Various approaches have been suggested to actively remove methane from the atmosphere. In 2019, researchers proposed a technique for removing methane from the atmosphere using zeolite. Each molecule of methane would be converted into , which has a far smaller impact on climate (99% less).  Replacing all atmospheric methane with  would reduce total greenhouse gas warming by approximately one-sixth.

Zeolite is a crystalline material with a porous molecular structure. Powerful fans could push air through reactors of zeolite and catalysts to absorb the methane. The reactor could then be heated to form and release . Because of methane's higher GWP, at a carbon price of $500/ton removing one ton of methane would earn $12,000.

In 2021, Methane Action proposed adding iron to seawater sprays from ship smokestacks. The group claimed that an amount equal to approximately 10% of the iron dust that already reaches the atmosphere could readily restore methane to pre-industrial levels.

Another approach is to apply titanium dioxide paint to large surfaces.

See also

China United Coalbed Methane
Climate change feedback
 emissions
Fugitive gas emissions
Greenhouse gas emissions from agriculture
Greenhouse Gases Observing Satellite-2
Global Methane Initiative

References

External links
 
 

Greenhouse gas emissions
Methane